77-LH-28-1 is a selective agonist of muscarinic acetylcholine receptor subtype 1 (M1) discovered in 2008. It is an allosteric agonist, exhibiting over 100-fold specificity for M1 over other muscarinic receptor subtypes. 77-LH-28-1 penetrates the brain by crossing the blood–brain barrier and is therefore a useful pharmacological tool with cognition enhancing effects.

References 

Muscarinic agonists
Piperidines
Lactams